Holland 1 (or HM submarine Torpedo Boat No 1) is the first submarine commissioned by the Royal Navy. Recovered in 1982, she was put on display at the Royal Navy Submarine Museum, Gosport. Her battery bank found in the boat was discovered to be functional after being cleaned and recharged.

History
She was ordered in 1901 from John Philip Holland and built at Barrow-in-Furness. Her keel was laid down 4 February 1901. In order to keep the boat’s construction secret, she was assembled in a building labelled "Yacht Shed", and the parts that had to be fabricated in the general yard were marked for "pontoon no 1". She was launched on 2 October 1901 and dived for the first time (in an enclosed basin) on 20 March 1902. Her sea trials began in April 1902.

In September 1902 she arrived at Portsmouth, along with the other completed Holland boat and their tender, . Together they made up the "First Submarine Flotilla", commanded by Captain Reginald Bacon. Holland 1 suffered an explosion 3 March 1903 that caused four injuries.

On 24 October 1904, with the rest of the Holland fleet and three A-class boats, Holland 1 sailed from Portsmouth to attack a Russian fleet that had mistakenly sunk a number of British fishing vessels in the North Sea in the Dogger Bank incident. The boats were recalled before any attack could take place.

The submarine was decommissioned and sold in 1913 to Thos. W. Ward for £410. By the time the submarine was sold she was considered so obsolete that she was sold with all fittings intact, and the only requirement put on the purchaser was that the torpedo tube be put out of action.

Loss

While being towed to the scrapyard, Holland 1 encountered very severe weather and sank about a mile and a half off Eddystone Lighthouse. No one was on board the submarine at the time, and, since the submarine had been seen to be sinking earlier in the journey, the crew of the tug were ready to release the tow rope, preventing any damage to the tug.

Recovery

The wreck was located in 1981 by Plymouth historian Michael Pearn and she was raised in November 1982. From 1983, after coating in anti-corrosion chemicals, she was displayed at the Royal Navy Submarine Museum. Work on restoring the submarine continued until September 1988. A talking figure was included to explain the details of the craft to visitors.  However, by 1993 it was apparent that the treatment had proved inadequate. A fibreglass tank was built around her, and she was immersed in sodium carbonate solution from 1995. After four years the corrosive chloride ions had been removed, and she was able to be displayed again after restoration work.

Listed as part of the National Historic Fleet, in 2001, on her centenary, a new purpose-built climate-controlled building was opened by Countess Mountbatten. In the same year the Royal Mail put a photo of the submarine on a 65 pence stamp. In 2011 the submarine was given an Engineering Heritage Award by the Institution of Mechanical Engineers

The original bank of batteries, recovered with the wreckage, were submitted for testing by the original manufacturer, Chloride Industrial Batteries Ltd based in Swinton, Greater Manchester. Following the initial clean, the lead batteries were recharged and found to be in good working order. Some of the original batteries still remain in the possession of Enersys (ex-CIBL) at the Newport plant, in South Wales.

See also
 Holland I
 Fenian Ram
 Royal Navy Submarine Service

Notes and references

External links

 Own page on RNSM website
 MaritimeQuest HMS Holland 1 Pages
 Early Holland Submarines  Photos of John Holland's Submarine No. 1 and the Fenian Ram at the Paterson Museum
The 'Talking Figure' from the Holland display in a video from a museum visit in 1989.

1901 ships
Ships built in Barrow-in-Furness
Holland-class submarines
Museum ships in the United Kingdom
Ships preserved in museums
Ships and vessels of the National Historic Fleet